Krisztián Vermes (born 7 July 1985) is a retired Hungarian footballer who played as a centre back.

Club career
Born in Budapest, Vermes came through the youth ranks at BVSC Budapest, clinching a move to Újpest FC for whom he made his professional league debut in the 2004–05 season.

In summer 2008 he sealed a move to Eredivisie side Sparta Rotterdam. He played 32 league and 3 KNVB cup games in 2008–09 season.

International career
Vermes made his debut for Hungary in a December 2005 friendly match against Mexico and earned his second and last cap so far in the same month against Caribbean minnows Antigua and Barbuda. Both games are recognized by FIFA and the Hungarian FA as full internationals but were played with a B-side.

External links
 Profile at magyarfutball.hu

HLSZ 
MLSZ 

1985 births
Living people
Footballers from Budapest
Association football central defenders
Association football fullbacks
Hungarian footballers
Hungary international footballers
Újpest FC players
Sparta Rotterdam players
Mezőkövesdi SE footballers
Kaposvári Rákóczi FC players
Szolnoki MÁV FC footballers
Kisvárda FC players
Nemzeti Bajnokság I players
Nemzeti Bajnokság II players
Eredivisie players
Hungarian expatriate footballers
Expatriate footballers in the Netherlands
Hungarian expatriate sportspeople in the Netherlands